Kareen Zebroff (born 1941 in Windsbach, Germany) is a Canadian-based author, actor and television host specialising in yoga. She and her family fled Marienbad as a child, due to the Soviet occupations in the Czech Republic immediately following World War II. She emigrated to Canada in the mid-1950s when her family settled in Dawson Creek, British Columbia.

She hosted a CTV television series, Kareen's Yoga from 1970 to 1979.

Her dramatic work include appearances on episodes of television series such as The Beachcombers, Danger Bay and MacGyver.

References

External links
Kareen Zebroff official site
 Deutsche Nationalbibliothek (German National Library): List of books by Kareen Zebroff

1941 births
Living people
Canadian television hosts
Canadian women television hosts
German expatriates in Canada
German yogis
Women yogis
Yoga teachers